Turna ("Crane") or Τουρκοπουλα, also known as Hey ağalar böyle m'olur, Το κάστρο της Αστροπαλιάς, and Ήλιε μου, ίντα σου ’καμα ("What Did I Do to You, My Sun"), is an anonymous Turkish and Greek folk song. Turkish lyrics to the song were written by the 17th-century Ottoman Turkish ashik Karacaoğlan.

See also
Karacaoğlan
Turnam Gidersen Mardine

References

External links
Zülfü Livaneli - Turna 
Tourna (Τούρνα) - Periklis Papapetropoulos (tambouras)
Tourna/Turna Greek Turkish shared musics songs
ΤΟΥΡΝΑ ΤΟΥΡΝΑ : DILEK KOC.wmv
To κάστρο της Αστροπαλιάς ( τούρνα ) 
Νίκος Κονιτόπουλος Τούρνα (HQ Official Audio Video)
ΤΟΥΡΚΟΠΟΥΛΑ, 1934, ΡΟΖΑ ΕΣΚΕΝΑΖΥ 
Neşe Demir - Minarenin Alemi (Turnam) 
Açan Doktor Değildin Niçin Açtın Yaremi, Turnem? 
Oğlan Boynuma Dolan 
Tourna/Turna Greek Turkish shared musics songs 

Greek-language songs
Greek folk songs
Turkish-language songs
Turkish folk songs
Domna Samiou songs
1980 songs